The 1995 Ordina Open was a men's ATP tennis tournament held in Rosmalen, Netherlands and played on outdoor grass courts. The event was part of the World Series of the 1995 ATP Tour. It was the sixth edition of the tournament and was played from 12 June through 19 June 1995.

Karol Kučera won his first career singles title.

Finals

Singles

 Karol Kučera defeated  Anders Järryd, 7–6(9–7), 7–6(7–4)

Doubles

 Richard Krajicek /  Jan Siemerink defeated  Hendrik Jan Davids /  Andrei Olhovskiy, 7–5, 6–3

References

External links
ITF – Tournament details
ATP – Tournament profile

Rosmalen Grass Court Championships
Ordina Open
1995 in Dutch tennis